Alexander Markuntsov (Japanese: アレクサンドル ・ マルクンツォフ; born 21 February 1982) is a Russian pair skater who also competed internationally for Japan.

Early in his career, Markuntsov competed internationally for Russia on the junior level with Valentina Razskazova. He had the most success with Yuko Kawaguchi, competing for Japan. They teamed up in 1999 and were the first pair representing Japan to medal at an ISU Championship, which they did when they won the silver medal at the 2001 World Junior Championships. They are the 2002 and 2003 Japanese national champions. Their highest placement at a senior ISU Championship was seventh at the 2003 Four Continents. They were coached by Tamara Moskvina. They ended their partnership following the 2002–2003 season.

In 2008, Markuntsov began skating as an adagio pair with British skater Catherine Harvey. Catherine Harvey has also skated and appeared in "HOLIDAY on ICE, the ROMANZA TOUR" They have skated as principal pairs in Disney on Ice shows. In 2009–10 they appeared as principal pairs on the Royal Caribbean cruise ship Navigator of the Seas cruising the Caribbean and Mediterranean seas. Harvey and Markuntsov were married in Manchester, England, in December 2010.
Harvey is currently LEAD COACH at Widnes Ice Rink.

Programs 
(with Kawaguchi)

Competitive highlights

With Kawaguchi for Japan

With Razskazova for Russia

References

External links 
 
 Pairs on Ice: Kawaguchi / Markuntsov

1982 births
Living people
Russian male pair skaters
Japanese male pair skaters
Figure skaters from Saint Petersburg
World Junior Figure Skating Championships medalists